The 1989–90 ACB season was the 7th season of the Liga ACB, after changing its name. The competition format was the same as the previous season.

FC Barcelona won their 4th ACB title, and their 7th overall. It was their 4th ACB title in a row.

Team Standings

First stage

Group A-1

Group A-2

Second stage

Group I

Group II

Group III

Playoffs

Relegation Playoffs

Tenerife Nº 1 and Gran Canaria were relegated.

Qualification Games
(I-1) CAI Zaragoza vs. (III-3) Cajacanarias
CAI Zaragoza win the series 3-0 and qualified to play in the A-1 the next season 
Game 1 May 4, 1990 @ Zaragoza: CAI Zaragoza 129 - Cajacanarias 82
Game 2 May 6, 1990 @ Zaragoza: CAI Zaragoza 98 - Cajacanarias 82
Game 3 May 11, 1990 @ La Laguna: Cajacanarias 83 - CAI Zaragoza 111

(I-2) Mayoral Maristas vs. (II-3) Caja San Fernando
 Caja San Fernando win the series 3-1 and qualified to play in the A-1 the next season  
Game 1 May 4, 1990 @ Málaga: Mayoral Maristas 78 - Caja San Fernando 75
Game 2 May 6, 1990 @ Málaga: Mayoral Maristas 67 - Caja San Fernando 76
Game 3 May 10, 1990 @ Sevilla: Caja San Fernando 85 - Mayoral Maristas 78
Game 4 May 12, 1990 @ Sevilla: Caja San Fernando 90 - Mayoral Maristas 86

(III-1) Pamesa Valencia vs. (II-2) Cajabilbao
Pamesa Valencia win the series 3-0 and qualified to play in the A-1 the next season
Game 1 May 3, 1990 @ Valencia: Pamesa Valencia 91 - Cajabilbao 90
Game 2 May 5, 1990 @ Valencia: Pamesa Valencia 85 - Cajabilbao 83
Game 3 May 10, 1990 @ Bilbao: Cajabilbao 86 - Pamesa Valencia 88

(II-1) Huesca Magia vs. (III-2) BBV Villalba
 BBV Villalba win the series 3-1 and qualified to play in the A-1 the next season
Game 1 May 3, 1990 @ Huesca: Huesca Magia 83 - BBV Villalba 86
Game 2 May 5, 1990 @ Huesca: Huesca Magia 83 - BBV Villalba 87
Game 3 May 10, 1990 @ Collado Villalba: BBV Villalba 89 - Huesca Magia 92
Game 4 May 12, 1990 @ Collado Villalba: BBV Villalba 78 - Huesca Magia 71

Championship Playoffs

External links
 ACB.com 
 linguasport.com 

Liga ACB seasons
Spain